The Rhode River is a  tidal tributary of the West River in Anne Arundel County, Maryland. It is south of the South River.

These are its named tidal creeks and coves starting at the upper end and going clockwise, with a lower-order tributary listed after the "&" symbol:
Muddy Creek
Fox Creek
Sheephead Cove
Sellman Creek
Bear Neck Creek & Whitemarsh Creek
Cadle Creek
Boathouse Cove

YMCA Camp Letts sits on a peninsula at the northern end of the Rhode River, and the Smithsonian Environmental Research Center occupies most of the northwestern shore of the Rhode River.

Carrs Wharf
Carrs Wharf is a community park on the Rhode River.

Early settlement
Rhode River Hundred is listed in records of some of the earliest settlements in the Province of Maryland.  In 1651, Robert Harwood surveyed Harwood Plantation on the Rhode River. A deed was written by Thomas Harwood of Streatley, Berks County (Berkshire), England to his son Richard Harwood for Hookers Purchase at the head of Muddy Creek.

The steamboat Emma Giles served the Rhode River between 1891 and 1932, making five trips per week.

See also
List of Maryland rivers
West/Rhode Riverkeeper web site
Maryland DNR Surf your watershed, Rhode & West

References

Rivers of Anne Arundel County, Maryland
Tributaries of the Chesapeake Bay
Rivers of Maryland